Kilmore may refer to:

Places

Australia
Electoral district of Kilmore, Victoria
Kilmore, Victoria, Australia, a town
Shire of Kilmore, a local government area north of Melbourne

Ireland
Kilmore, County Cavan, a parish 
Kilmore, County Wexford, a village 
Kilmore, Dublin, a suburb 
Kilmore Quay, County Wexford, a fishing village

Northern Ireland
Kilmore, County Antrim, a townland in County Antrim
Kilmore, County Armagh, a village and townland in County Armagh
Kilmore, County Down, a village, parish and townland

Other places
Kilmore, Skye, Scotland
Kilmore, Indiana, United States

People 
Chris Kilmore (born 1973), American musician and DJ
Kevin Kilmore (born 1959), English footballer

Other uses
Bishop of Kilmore
Diocese of Kilmore (disambiguation)

See also
 Kilmore East, Victoria, Australia
 Kilmore West, Dublin, Ireland